The Halifax Panthers are a professional rugby league club in Halifax, West Yorkshire, which formed in 1873. Halifax were one of the original twenty-two rugby clubs that formed the Northern Rugby Football Union in 1895. They have been Rugby League Champions four times and have won the Challenge Cup five times. They were known as the Halifax Blue Sox between 1996 and 2002.

They have rivalries with neighbours Bradford and Huddersfield and with fellow Championship side Featherstone Rovers.

Known as 'Fax', the club colours are blue and white hoops, white shorts and blue and white socks. They share the Shay stadium with the town's football club, Halifax Town.

History

1873–1939: Early years

The club was founded as Halifax in 1873. After winning the first Yorkshire Cup in 1878, they went on to win it on another four occasions. Several players were picked for the Yorkshire County side in these years, and five were for the England rugby union team. In 1886, the club moved to Thrum Hall, which would be their home ground for the next 112 years. The first game there was played on 18 September 1886 against Hull F.C. and drew 8,000 spectators.

After the 1890-91 season, Halifax along with other Yorkshire Senior clubs Batley, Bradford, Brighouse, Dewsbury, Huddersfield, Hull, Hunslet, Leeds, Liversedge, Manningham and Wakefield decided that they wanted their own county league starting in 1891 along the lines of a similar competition that had been played in Lancashire. The clubs wanted full control of the league but the Yorkshire Rugby Football Union would not sanction the competition as it meant giving up control of rugby football to the senior clubs.

Halifax were founding members of the breakaway Northern Rugby Football Union in 1895. In 1896, Halifax lost out on winning the first ever Rugby Football League Championship by a single point, with Manningham becoming the inaugural champions. In 1902–03, they achieved the 'double' by winning the Challenge Cup and finishing top of Division One. They won the cup again the following season, and were the first ever Championship play-off winners in 1906–07.

Halifax won their first Wembley Challenge Cup final in 1931, beating York F.C. 22–8. An estimated 100,000 people lined the route to a civic reception at the town hall.

Towards the end of the 1937 season, Streatham and Mitcham folded after just one full season in the league. The club had made a number of high-profile signings from the New Zealand All Blacks, including George Nēpia and Charles Smith, and these players now joined Halifax.

In 1938, Halifax reached the semi-final of the Challenge Cup, after winning three replays in a row, before they were knocked out by Barrow at Fartown, Huddersfield in the dying seconds of the game.

In 1939, Halifax became the last team to win the Challenge Cup final before the war. Favourites Salford were beaten 20–3 in front of a record 55,453 spectators.

Post-Second World War

In 1947 Halifax's Hudson Irving died from a heart attack while playing at Dewsbury.

In 1949, Halifax's David Craven died after breaking his neck playing against Workington Town.

The 1949 Challenge Cup final was sold out for first time as 95,050 spectators saw Bradford Northern beat Halifax.

In the 1950s, Halifax were Championship runners-up three times, beat Hull F.C. in Yorkshire Cup finals in 1954 and 1955, and were Yorkshire League winners in 1950, 1953, 1954 and 1956. Halifax were unbeaten at their home ground of Thrum Hall between December 1952 and November 1956. They played in a Wembley final of the 1953–54 Challenge Cup, featuring in the first ever drawn final against Warrington in 1954, losing in the replay at Odsal Stadium, Bradford in front of what was then a world record rugby league crowd officially given as 102,569, although estimates suggest another 20,000 plus entered unofficially.

After securing a Yorkshire league and cup double in 1955–56, the club was in sight of winning "All Four Cups". Wembley was reached after an 11–10 Challenge Cup semi-final victory over Wigan at Odsal and Halifax beat St. Helens 23–8 in the Championship semi-final. However, St Helens ran out 13–2 winners in the Challenge Cup and a week later, Halifax lost in the Championship match against Hull at Maine Road, Manchester, a last minute penalty goal securing a 10–9 victory for Hull.

In 1959, Halifax hosted Wigan before a club record 29,153 people in the third round of the Challenge Cup.

Halifax won their third Championship in 1964-65 after finishing 7th in the league table and progressing through the new 16-team play-offs. They became Champions by beating St Helens 15-7 in the Championship Final held at Station Road, Swinton. Terry Fogerty of Halifax was awarded the Harry Sunderland Trophy for man-of-the-match.

In 1965-66 Halifax again reached the Championship Final through the play-offs, after finishing 10th in the league table. Their opponents were again St Helens who this time ran out comfortable winners by 35-12.

1960–1996: Financial difficulties

Halifax was hit hard by the financial situation of the late 1960s, and 1970s. Fortunes on the pitch suffered as the shortfall was met by selling players. In 1970, a concert was held at Thrum Hall in an attempt to alleviate these financial troubles. Horrific weather conditions meant that only around 3,000 arrived to watch the Halifax Pop and Blues Concert which made a loss of £6,000.

Despite victory in the inaugural Regal Trophy Final (then Players No. 6 Trophy) in 1971–72, financial problems continued for the next decade. In 1983, local businessman, David Brook provided much needed investment in the club.

Chris Anderson was player-coach of Halifax from November 1984 to May 1987 when he retired from playing to be coach in 1987–88. He brought over Australian internationals such as Graham Eadie and Chris Anderson. The team climbed out of the Second Division, won the League Championship in 1985–86, the 1986–87 Challenge Cup against St. Helens and made a second successive appearance in the Challenge Cup final in 1988 when they lost to Wigan. Despite this on-field success, Halifax were banned from signing new players by the RFL after complaints of non-payments in November 1988.

In 1989, John Dorahy took up a position as captain-coach of Halifax for the 1989–90 season. Halifax players threatened strike action over unpaid wages in April 1990. The club sold Neil James for £20,000 to pay wages but were still in financial trouble including an unpaid tax bill of £70,000. Halifax went into the hands of receivers, £760,000 in debt, a take-over bid having failed after the players refused to take a pay cut. The club was re-formed and the assets were purchased by the Marsland/Gartland consortium of local businessmen.

Peter Roe was appointed as head coach at Halifax for season 1990–91 when they achieved promotion along with Salford who were their opponents in the Divisional Final at Old Trafford. The club's record victory was set in October 1990 with an 82–8 win over Runcorn Highfield at Thrum Hall. Roe was removed from office 24-hours later when he refused to re-apply for his own job. The Halifax board stated that he did not have the required experience for a club in the top division.

Roger Millward took the coaching job at Halifax, but was only there 17 months before resigning. Mal Reilly became the coach in 1992. In August 1993, in financial trouble again, Halifax put seven players on the transfer list for a total of £170,000.

1996–2002: Summer era

In 1996, the first tier of British rugby league clubs played the inaugural Super League season and changed from a winter to a summer season. In the lead-up, the Halifax President, Tony Gartland, and former Chairman, Peter Marsland, left the board over plans to merge with rivals Bradford Northern and join the proposed Super League as single club.

Halifax joined the Super League in 1996, the local newspaper did a poll of suggested nicknames for the club with Halifax Bombers topping the list. But the Board upon the recommendation of Chief executive Nigel Wood chose Halifax Blue Sox. However, this proved to be unpopular with most supporters who continued to refer to them as 'Fax'. Halifax finished third in Super League in 1998 under John Pendlebury.

Halifax sold Thrum Hall for £1.5 million to Asda for a supermarket development in 1998, and moved across town to their present home, the Shay stadium, which they share with the town's football club Halifax Town. The proceeds from the sale were supposed to enable Halifax RLFC to make a contribution to the costs of a redevelopment of the Shay stadium, but the money was swallowed up by debts.

Under Chief Executive Nigel Wood, Halifax went to Jacksonville University, Florida, in 2000 to help develop American rugby league, along with Salford.

Steve Linnane joined the club as assistant coach from Rochdale Hornets and took full charge after Gary Mercer's resignation. With the club threatened again by financial problems and the danger of relegation Halifax sacked coach Steve Linnane in August 2002, the morning after a 64–0 loss to St. Helens, which came after nine losses from ten games which put the club at risk of relegation. Replacement Tony Anderson signed a deal that covered the four remaining matches of this season.

2003–2008: Relegation and financial difficulties
The club returned to their traditional Halifax RLFC name at the start of 2003. At the end of the 2003 season they were relegated from Super League to National League One. Halifax's financial troubles meant they were unable to retain a full-time team and they struggled in the new league. In 2004 having been saved from insolvency by their new chairman Howard Posner they narrowly avoided a second relegation to National League 2, with a last-gasp victory in a play-off with York City Knights.

Anthony Farrell was asked to become temporary coach until the end of the year following the sacking of Tony Anderson. After saving the club from relegation the following season and taking the club within a whisker of a place in the grand final, they lost out to Castleford. The year after was less successful and after a poor series of results including a club record loss to Hull Kingston Rovers, Farrell lost his job. Martin Hall took over the role of head coach in June 2006.

In August 2006, Halifax was on the verge of going bust. The club announced that it needed to raise £90,000 or it would go into liquidation. Rugby league fans nationwide rallied behind 'Fax', and through visits to the ground during home fixtures and other fund-raising events, were able to raise £55,000. Howard Posner then came forward and announced that he would loan the club the remaining £35,000 in order to keep Halifax alive, repayment of the loan was waived. Posner and the new board of directors subsequently invested further sums to ensure the club could survive and that Halifax would be playing in National League One during 2007. Howard Posner, again became club Chairman and Martin Hall took up the post of director of football in October 2006. Assistant coach Matt Calland was then named the new head coach of Halifax.

2009–Present: Rebuilding and Championship Success
In the 2009 Challenge Cup Halifax came within moments of reaching the quarter-finals, losing by one point in extra time to Castleford. They also lost the final of the Co-Operative Championship to Barrow 26 -18. Barrow were later stripped of the title due to salary cap breaches. In April 2010, with the club on a sound financial footing, Howard Posner stepped down as chairman and was replaced by long time supporter and director Michael Steele. In 2010, Halifax won the Co-Operative Championship, beating Featherstone Rovers 23–22 in the final after extra time. It was the first trophy Halifax had won in 23 years. In 2011, Halifax reached the Northern Rail Cup Final at Bloomfield Road, Blackpool, losing narrowly to Leigh in the last minute. They were also unable to defend their Championship title, losing heavily to Sheffield Eagles in the play-offs. Karl Harrison took over as head coach at the end of the season.

The following season, Halifax made it to the final of the Northern Rail Cup but this time were victorious over favourites Featherstone Rovers beating them 21–12 in a match watched by over 7,000 spectators. In 2015 Halifax finished the regular season in the top four of the Championship, earning them a place in the Qualifiers. Despite being the lowest ranked team in the competition, and part time, they beat promotion favourites Leigh and Sheffield Eagles to finish 6th out of 8, and secured improved central funding for 2016.
After a disappointing 6th place finish in 2016, the club again reached the qualifies in 2017 and 2018 finishing 3rd and 4th respectively.  This made the club the most successful part-time team in the RFL. Long serving director and chairman Michael Steele stepped down from the Board at the end of 2017.

In December 2020, Halifax RLFC adopted the name Halifax Panthers. 
In the 2021 Championship season, Halifax Panthers finished in third place and qualified for the playoffs.  After defeating Whitehaven in the first week, Halifax travelled to Featherstone with the winner to play Toulouse Olympique in the Million Pound Game.  Halifax would lose the match 42-10 which ended their season.  It was also the final game for the retiring Scott Grix.
In the 2022 RFL Championship season, Halifax finished third and qualified for the playoffs. However, they would be eliminated in the first week of the playoffs by York City losing 26-24.

Stadiums

1886–1998: Thrum Hall

Shortly after they were founded in 1873, Halifax bought some land in Halifax from a farmer with the aim to build a multipurpose sports venue. Thrum Hall hosted rugby league finals and test matches as well as speedway. Halifax played at Thrum Hall for 112 years until they sold the land for £1.5 million to ASDA to move to a new stadium in the Super League era.

Thrum Hall was notable for its distinctive slope. As it was built on the side of a hill, the ground had a 4 yard slope from the main grandstand side to the outer wing.

Thrum Hall had a spectator capacity of 9,832 when it closed as a sports venue.

1999–Present: The MBi Shay 

Halifax first played at the Shay in the 1998 Super League season and ground shared with association football team Halifax Town. The Shay has a current capacity of 14,061 (5,830 seated).

The Shay hosted games during the 2013 Rugby League World Cup.

Colours and badge

Colours
Halifax have traditionally played in blue and white. Their home jersey is blue and hoops and their away colours have been in recent seasons a combination of red, black and white, replacing their traditional red and white hoops.

Badge

Since its formation in 1873, Halifax used the town's coat of arms as a crest as many other clubs did until the advent of Super League, Halifax and many other clubs, changed their names and badge thus becoming known as the Halifax Blue Sox from the 1996 season. This however was unpopular with fans and the name was reverted to 'Halifax' and the town coat of arms was reintroduced with Halifax under it.

Kit manufacturers and sponsors

In 2022, a consortium named PK 2022 Ltd took control of the club.

2022 squad

2023 transfers

Gains

Losses

Players

Staff

Coaching team

Past coaches
Also see :Category:Halifax R.L.F.C. coaches.

 Arthur Atkinson 1948-49
 Albert Fearnley 1964-65
 Jack Scroby 197?
 Les Pearce 197?-80
 Maurice Bamford 1978-80
 Ken Roberts 1982
 Colin Dixon 1982–84
 Chris Anderson 1984–88
 Ross Strudwick 1988–89
 John Dorahy 1989–90
 Peter Roe 1991–92
 Roger Millward 1992
 Mal Reilly 1993–94
 Steve Simms 1994–96
 John Pendlebury 1997–98
 Gary Mercer 1999-00
 Steve Linnane 2001
 Tony Anderson 2002-04
 Anthony Farrell 2004-06
 Martin Hall 2006
 Matt Calland 2008–11
 Karl Harrison 2012-14
 Richard Marshall 2015-19
 Simon Grix 2019–present

Youth and community development

Activities:

Blue Base Study Support Centre was a community sporting initiative sponsored by Halifax, and part of the national Playing For Success educational scheme launched for school pupils to interact with professional sports teams, to help provide motivation to young people. Locally, Blue Base was working with an initiative established by the DfES, in partnership with Calderdale Children and Young People's Services and Halifax. The funding ceased in March 2011, when the Blue Base Centre closed.

The centre existed to support Calderdale schools in their drive to raise attainment levels with their pupils. This is achieved by developing young peoples' levels of motivation, self-esteem and helping them to have a more positive attitude towards learning by concentrating particularly upon literacy, numeracy and the use of ICT.

Retired player, Frank Watene, leads Calderdale Community Coaching Trust which is the club's Foundation providing a wide range of educational programmes designed to promote physical activity and healthy lifestyles amongst people of all ages in the Calderdale area. Activities include Touch Rugby League, healthy heart circuit training and an 'Over 50s Club which plays Kurling at the Shay stadium.

Mascots 
Original Mascot: (100 years ago) Smut the Cat

Recent Mascots: Billy & Bluey, Fat Cat, Bruno the Bear.

Present Mascots: Halicat.

Seasons

Super League era

Honours
Major titles

'''Other titles

All-time statistics

Match 
Goals: 14, Bruce Burton at Hunslet, 27 August 1972
Tries: 8, Keith Williams v Dewsbury, 9 November 1957
Points: 34, Joe Keyes, v Workington 17 July 2022

Season 
Goals: 156 Graham Holroyd 2008
Tries: 48, Johnny Freeman 1956–57
Points: 362, John Schuster 1994–95

Career
Goals: 1,028, Ronnie James 1960–72
Tries: 290, Johnny Freeman 1954–67
Points: 2,191, Ronnie James 1960–72

Halifax appearances
Career: Stan Kielty 482 (1946–58)
Season: John Thorley 48 (1956–57)
Consecutive: Dick Davies 108 (1925–28)

Representative appearances
Great Britain: Karl Harrison 11
Great Britain: Ken Roberts 10
Great Britain: Charlie Renilson 8
England: Alvin Ackerley 6
Wales: Arthur Daniels 13
Yorkshire: Archie Rigg 14
Lancashire: Ken Roberts 4
Cumberland: Alvin Ackerley 13

Highest score
94–4 v Myton Warriors (Challenge Cup) 25 March 2012

Biggest loss
6–88 v Hull KR (Northern Rail Cup) 23 April 2006

Record crowd
Thrum Hall: 29,153 vs Wigan (Challenge Cup), 21 March 1959
The Shay: 9,827 vs Bradford Bulls (Challenge Cup), 12 March 2000
All-time: 102,569 vs Warrington, 5 May 1954 at Odsal Stadium – 1954 Challenge Cup Final Replay
vs International touring team: 18,773 vs Australia, 20 September 1952 – 1952–53 Kangaroo Tour

All club statistics are courtesy of Andrew Hardcastle (Official Club Historian)(amendments required)

Notes

References

External links 
 Official Website
 Independent Halifax Supporters Website

 
Rugby clubs established in 1873
1873 establishments in England
Founder members of the Northern Rugby Football Union
Super League teams
English rugby league teams